St. James Hotel may refer to:

St. James Hotel (Jacksonville, Florida), a destroyed hotel, the site of the St. James Building
St. James Hotel (Red Wing, Minnesota), listed on the National Register of Historic Places (NRHP)
St. James Hotel (Cimarron, New Mexico)
St. James Hotel (Philadelphia, Pennsylvania), listed on the NRHP
St. James Hotel (San Diego), part of the Gaslamp Quarter Historic District
St James's Hotel and Club, London